Marco Liao (born 13 February 1977) is a Taiwanese television host. Liao has hosted TV travel shows, including Discover The Great Silkroad (2013–2016), Out of Africa (2018) and the current series of The Incredible Hidden Gems for which he won Golden Bell Awards for Best Lifestyle Show Host in 2014 and 2018.

Hosting
Discover The Great Silkroad "發現大絲路"(2013–2016)
Out of Africa "我的非洲很有事"(2018)
The Incredible Hidden Gems "秘境不思溢" (????–present)

Awards
2014 Golden Bell Awards: Best Lifestyle Show Host (Discover The Great Silkroad – Season 2)
2018 Golden Bell Awards: Best Lifestyle Show Host (The Incredible Hidden Gems – Season 3)

References

Living people
1977 births
Taiwanese television presenters